Glen Margaret  is a rural community of the Halifax Regional Municipality in the Canadian province of Nova Scotia on the Chebucto Peninsula. It was first inhabited by the Mi'kmaq who spent their summers along the coast to catch a fresh supply of fish. The first overseas settlers arrived during the late 18th century and by the early 19th century a number of land grants attracted permanent residents.

Today, the community is the home of a number of creative persons such as artists, publishers and authors.

References
 Explore HRM

Communities in Halifax, Nova Scotia
General Service Areas in Nova Scotia